The chestnut-backed chickadee (Poecile rufescens), formerly Parus rufescens, is a small passerine bird in the tit family, Paridae.

It is found in the Pacific Northwest of the United States and western Canada, from southern Alaska to southwestern California. It is a permanent resident within its range, with some seasonal movements as feeding flocks move short distances in search of food. They usually move to lower elevations in the same area upon onset of winter and move back up to higher elevations in late summer.

Chickadees are able to use nocturnal hypothermia to regulate energy expenditure, allowing them to survive harsh winters where other bird species not utilizing thermal regulation would not be able to. Some estimates put the energy conserved while using nocturnal hypothermia all the way up to 32%.

The head is dark blackish-brown with white cheeks, the mantle is bright rufous-brown, the wing feathers are dark gray with paler fringes. The underparts are white to pale grayish-white, with rufous or pale gray flanks. It is often considered the most handsome of all chickadees. They often move through the forest in mixed feeding flocks, and are often seen in large groups with bushtits and warblers.

There are three subspecies, with the flanks being grayer and less rufous further south:
Poecile rufescens rufescens (Townsend, 1837). Alaska south to northwest California. Broad rufous band on flanks.
Poecile rufescens neglectus (Ridgway, 1879). Coastal central California (Marin County). Narrow rufous band on flanks.
Poecile rufescens barlowi (Grinnell, 1900). Coastal southwestern California (south of San Francisco Bay). Almost no rufous color on flanks.

Its habitat is low elevation coniferous and mixed coniferous forests. In the San Francisco Bay Area this bird has readily adapted to suburban settings, prompting a range expansion. It is a cavity-nester, usually utilizing an abandoned woodpecker hole, but sometimes excavating on its own. Chestnut-backed chickadees use much fur and hair to make their nests. Their nests are actually 50% fur and hair. The most common hair they use comes from deer, rabbits, and coyotes. The adult chickadees also make a layer of fur about a centimeter thick which is used to cover the eggs on the nest whenever they leave the nest. It lays 5–8 (sometimes 9) eggs per clutch.

Its food is largely insects and other invertebrates gleaned from foliage. Chestnut-backed chickadees take some seeds, especially those of conifers, and fruit. It will visit bird feeders, including hummingbird feeders, and especially loves suet.

Molecular phylogenetic studies have shown that the chestnut-backed chickadee is sister to the boreal chickadee (Poecile hudsonicus).

Gallery

References

External links

Miller, K. (2001). Animal Diversity Web: Parus rufescens. Retrieved 2006-NOV-21.
 Chestnut-backed chickadee at BirdHouses101.com
 Chestnut-backed chickadee species account – Cornell Lab of Ornithology
 Tool use by chestnut-backed chickadee
 
 
 

chestnut-backed chickadee
Native birds of Alaska
Native birds of the Northwestern United States
Native birds of the West Coast of the United States
Birds of the Sierra Nevada (United States)
Tool-using animals
chestnut-backed chickadee
chestnut-backed chickadee